Urbana High School is a secondary public school in Ijamsville, Maryland, United States. It serves grades 9-12 and is a part of the Frederick County Public Schools.

History
Urbana High School was founded in 1995 and has grown rapidly.

Demographics
The demographic breakdown of the 1,907 students enrolled in 2020-2021 was:
Male - 50.3%
Female - 49.7%

Native American/Alaskan Native - 0.3%
Asian - 16.8%
Black/African American - 9.1%
Hispanic/Latino - 11%
White - 63%
Multiracial - <1%

9.8% of the students were eligible for free or reduced lunch.

Academics
In 2021, Urbana High School was ranked 8th in Maryland and 375th nationally by U.S. News & World Report. The school has an Honors Program, an Advanced Placement Program, as well as an International Baccalaureate Diploma Program. In both 2018 and 2019, Urbana was recognized as a Maryland Blue Ribbon School and as a National Blue Ribbon School respectively for consistently high student achievement.

Athletics

Fall Season
Boys: Cross Country, Football, Golf, Soccer, Unified Tennis
Girls: Cheerleading, Cross Country, Field Hockey, Soccer, Volleyball, Unified Tennis

Winter Season
Boys: Basketball, Ice Hockey, Indoor Track & Field, Swimming & Diving, Wrestling, Unified Bocce
Girls: Basketball, Cheerleading, Indoor Track & Field, Swimming & Diving, Unified Bocce

Spring Season
Boys: Baseball, Lacrosse, Tennis, Outdoor Track & Field, Unified Track
Girls: Lacrosse, Softball, Tennis, Outdoor Track & Field, Unified Track

References

External links

Frederick County Public Schools-School Profile for Urbana High School

Public high schools in Maryland
International Baccalaureate schools in Maryland
Educational institutions established in 1996
Schools in Frederick County, Maryland
1996 establishments in Maryland